Causewayhead is a hamlet in the civil parish of Holme Low in Cumbria, England, about  south-east of Silloth. The B5302 road runs through the hamlet on its way to Abbeytown and Wigton.

See also

Listed buildings in Holme Low

References

Hamlets in Cumbria
Allerdale